The 1947 Prairie View A&M Panthers football team was an American football team that represented Prairie View A&M University in the Southwestern Athletic Conference (SWAC) during the 1947 college football season. Prairie View ranked No. 17 among the nation's black college football teams according to the Pittsburgh Courier and its Dickinson Rating System.

Schedule

References

Prairie View
Prairie View A&M Panthers football seasons
Prairie View football